The human right to a clean, healthy and sustainable environment is a resolution by the United Nations General Assembly and before that the United Nations Human Rights Council (HRC, as HRC/RES/48/13), that recognizes a healthy environment as a human right. It was adopted at the 48th session of the HRC, marking the first time that the HRC recognized a human right in a resolution. The draft resolution was put forward by the core group comprising Costa Rica (Penholder), Morocco, Slovenia, Switzerland and the Maldives. The vote passed with 43 votes in favor, 0 votes against, and 4 abstentions (China, India, Japan and the Russian Federation).

UN General Assembly 
The resolution in itself is not legally binding, but it "invites the United Nations General Assembly to consider the matter" (i.e. the human right to a clean, healthy and sustainable environment).

In 2022, the US voted in favor of UN General Assembly Resolution 76/300, recognizing the right to a healthy environment.

See also 
 Right to a healthy environment
 Human rights and climate change

References 

United Nations